HMS Cavendish was one of eight  destroyers built for the Royal Navy during the Second World War. Commissioned in late 1944, she was built as a flotilla leader with additional accommodation for staff officers. The ship was assigned to the Home Fleet in 1945 after working up where she escorted capital ships of the fleet. Cavendish was sold for scrap in 1967.

Design and description
The Ca-class destroyer was a repeat of the preceding .

The ships were powered by a pair of geared steam turbines, each driving one propeller shaft using steam provided by two Admiralty three-drum boilers. As a flotilla leader, Cavendishs complement was 222 officers and ratings.

The main armament of the destroyers consisted of four QF  Mk IV dual-purpose guns, one superfiring pair each fore and aft of the superstructure protected by partial gun shields. Their anti-aircraft suite consisted of one twin-gun stabilised Mk IV "Hazemeyer" mount for  Bofors guns amidships and two twin and a pair of single mounts for six  Oerlikon AA guns. The ships were also fitted with two quadruple mounts amidships for 21-inch (533 mm) torpedo tubes. For anti-submarine work, they were equipped with a pair of depth charge rails and four throwers for 108 depth charges.

Construction and career
Cavendish was laid down by John Brown & Company at their shipyard in Clydebank on 19 May 1943 with the name of Sibyl and was launched on 12 April 1944 by which time she had been renamed. She was commissioned on 13 December and was allocated to the 6th Destroyer Flotilla for service with the Home Fleet. After a refit in mid-1945 to augment her anti-aircraft armament, she was transferred for service in the Far East in June, but joined the East Indies Fleet at Trincomalee, British Ceylon, in August.

Post war service

Following the war Cavendish paid off into reserve. She was selected for modernisation and the work was completed in 1955. She emerged from modernisation in 1955 for service with the 6th Destroyer Flotilla as part of the Home Fleet, including service in the Mediterranean. In 1960 she was deployed for service with the Far Eastern Fleet at Singapore. In 1964 she returned to Portsmouth and received a brief refit. Cavendish was paid off on 1 January 1965 and was sold for scrap to Hughes Bolckow on 2 August 1967. She arrived at the breaker's yard in Blyth for scrapping on 14 August 1967.

References

Bibliography
 
 
 
 
 
 
 
 
 
 

World War II destroyers of the United Kingdom
Cold War destroyers of the United Kingdom
1944 ships
Ships built on the River Clyde
C-class destroyers (1943) of the Royal Navy